Marie Connor Leighton (4 February 186728 January 1941) was a prolific author of serial fiction and melodramatic novels. She married fellow writer Robert Leighton and her most famous work Convict 99 was written jointly with him. However her writing income was far in excess of his.

Paternity and birth
While most sources describe Connor as the daughter of James Nenon Alexander Connor (183521 June 1897) this is not accurate as Marie's mother Elizabeth Ann Treglown (c. 184216 April 1908) had a different husband when Connor was born and only married James Nenon Alexander Connor in the first quarter of 1869, when Marie Connor was already two years old.

While Elizabeth Anne Treglown was living at Camborne, Cornwall, with her parents, Josiah Henry Harris (c. 184818 April 1917), a newspaper reporter, visited her and courted her. He was accepted as her fiancé by her family and the couple had been engaged for some time. In April 1865, the pair travelled to Paris, and were married there, on 6 April 1865, at the English Episcopal Church, in the presence of the British Ambassador. The marriage had been a surprise to the family, and Harris had announced it by letter.

The new couple returned to England, and lived with Elizabeth's parents in Camborne, but after a week, Harris walked out, without saying where he was going. Elizabeth found that he had gone to Bristol and joined him there, but after a time, he again left, this time for Torquay. She joined him in Torquay, but after a time, he again deserted her. By now, her family had moved to Montpelier in Bristol, where Elizabeth gave birth to her daughter at 7 York Road, on 4 February 1867, initially registered as Martha Annie, but later known as Marie. Elizabeth registered the birth at Clifton on 13 February 1867. Elizabeth was running a school in Montpelier with her sisters Mary Ann (c. 1851 August 1913)and Ellen (c. 1845) while living with her mother.

Josiah seemed fond of the child, caressed it, and treated it as his own. However, after Josiah had again failed in his promises of support for his wife and child, they entered the Workhouse at Clifton, Bristol, on 30 April 1867. The parish authorities, who were responsible for the Workhouse, sought a warrant to arrest Harris for failing to support his wife. Josiah was arrested at Merthyr in South Wales where he worked for The Merthyr Telegraph. He was tried on 9 May 1867 at Bristol Police Court.

Josiah's defence was that he was not liable for maintenance as the couple were not legally married. There was some discussion of this, and the court held, that until a superior court determined that there was no marriage, Josiah was liable. Josiah met with the parish authorities and came to an agreement to pay maintenance. The case was suspended for a month to ensure that he followed through on this promise. It was understood that proceedings to set aside the marriage would be taken in another court.

In the first quarter of 1869, Elizabeth married widower James Nenon Connor in Kensington.. James was a widower, his first wife Eziza Jones (c. 1828May 1864) had died five years earlier. Elizabeth described herself as a widow on the marriage certificate. They had one child themselves, Valentine Alexander Nenon Connor (5 June 187510 May 1927), who emigrated to Canada and worked an engineer there before dying of stomach cancer and pneumonia in Toronto.

Early life
Her step-father had sold his commission in the 87th (Royal Irish Fusiliers) Regiment of Foot and so lost his pension, to that the family lived a hand to mouth existence, living the high life when in funds and hiding out in a small house in St John's Wood when creditors became too insistent.

Clare Leighton's biography of Connor states that Connor had a strange upbringing. Neither her mother or father had much interest in her and she was left to her own devices. She copied an entire novel by hand and sent it to a London publisher, who recognised it, and was so puzzled by the childish handwriting that he visited to find out who was responsible. Her next project was writing names and random from a street directory and sending anonymous letters, warning the recipients that their wives or husbands were being unfaithful with people whose names and addresses she had also picked at random.

Clare Leighton also related what Connor told her children about her first love affair. When she was ten, Connor fell in love with a window-cleaner, a married father of eight. Their correspondence was discovered and the window cleaner threatened with the law. Connor's parents packed her off to a convent in France where she fell in love with the Mother Superior and the Priest and became a devout Catholic for the rest of her life.

After returning from France, Connor got stage-struck, falling in love with the actor Wilson Barrett (18461904), and writing poems inspired by him. Her parents decided that the only cure was to give her a taste of the stage, so she went on tour with Barrett, chaperoned by one of her maternal aunts. The experience cured her of her love of the theatre.

Early writing
Connor published her first novel Beauty's Queen, a three-volume melodrama, in 1884 when she was 17.The Graphic, after noting that the novel "contains some very remarkable incidents indeed" concluded by saying "The novel is tragical to the highest pitch. All the characters of any consequence are left dead except one little boy, who, it is cordially to be hoped, grows up to meet with more ordinary experiences. The story is altogether ridiculously impossible, and is told in a style of sentimental exaggeration to which no description can do any sort of justice."  Sutherland calls this book "An extraordinary mishmash of romantic and religious passion" and said that "it provoked most reviewers to sarcastic drollery", but that "women readers liked it."

Marriage and children
Connor quickly followed up with another and had published five novels before her marriage to Robert Leighton (5 June 185811 May 1934). Born in Scotland but growing up in Liverpool, Leighton moved to London in 1879 and began working for Young Folks magazine as an assistant editor. Leighton was the editor from 1884 to 1885. Connor was a contributor to the magazine. In 1886 Leighton left Little Folks to move to the Bristol Observer, but returned to London in 1887.

Kemp and Mitchell state that the Connor and Leighton eloped to Scotland, but the UK marriage records show that they got married in Marylebone, London in the first quarter of 1889. It is clear that they did elope. Connor's mother traced her to a hotel in Fleet Street, and was only placated when the couple were able to show her their marriage certificate.

The family lived at 'Vallombrosa' at 40 Abbey Road, St John's Wood, London, where they led a chaotic bohemian existence. Every summer they migrated to a turreted seaside cliff-top villa at Lowestoft in Suffolk.

Connor and her husband had four children:
Their first child was accidentally smothered in infancy by a nurse.
Roland Aubrey Leighton (27 March 189523 December 1915), a poet who was killed in the First World War. He was Vera Brittain's fiancé and features largely in Testament of Youth, the first instalment of her memoirs. He was his mother's favourite. "He is the only one of my children who is beautiful enough to be worth dressing" her daughter reports her as saying. His mother's love for him "stopped just short of idolatry". Marie was devastated when Roland was killed and published an anonymous memoir of him as Boy of My Heart in 1916.
Clare Leighton (12 April 18984 November 1989), a writer and artist. She wrote several novels as well as the biography of her mother, and was a noted wood engraver. Connor had been dismissive of Clare's looks, ambitions and talents.
Evelyn Ivor Robert Leighton (31 May 190121 October 1969) was destined from boyhood for the Navy. He joined the navy on 15 January 1915, and remained in the Navy after the Great War, being posted to the Royal Australian Navy for a while, and marrying an English bride while he was there.

Works
The following is a list, principally drawn from the Jisc Library Hub Discover collated catalogue. One title not listed on the Jisc catalogues was found in the list of titles on Holland's blog about Connor. The notes indicate if and where online copies of the texts can be found.

Convict 99
Connor continued to churn out novels after her marriage, writing four in total with Leighton, including her most successful work Convict 99. A true story of penal servitude. Sutherland describes this as: "a powerful anti-prison tract which became their best-known work. It has a highly sensational plot in which the hero, Laurence Gray, is framed by a rival in love on false charges of embezzlement and murder. Sent to Grimley Prison as Convict 99 on a life sentence, Laurence suffers various indignities before escaping and proving his innocence. The force of the book lies in its graphic and credible depictions of life in jail (particularly the part played by corporal punishment, or the ‘cat’)."

The story was published first as a serial in Answers one of the publications produced by Alfred Harmsworth (18651922), for whom both Connor and Leighton worked. It was published by Grant Richards in London. Quoting Grant Richards, the head of that publishing house, Kemp and Mitchell say that Convict 99 was hugely successful as a serial and was used time and again in different papers, but that it never attract as large a public in book form. Kemp and Mill also say that Convict 99 was Connor's greatest success.

Few of Connor's novels were illustrated, and even those which had any illustration usually only had a front-piece. This was normal for novels intended for adults. However Convict 99, like the first three books jointly written with Leighton, was illustrated.  The eight illustrations below were made by Stanley L. Wood (1866-1928), and are from the online copy at The British Library.

Later life
Clare Leighton says of her mother that "all men fell in love with her". During her childhood, she relates, there were three men who, with her father, were in love with her mother. Roland called them "Mother's Old Men".

From 1891 both Connor and Leighton worked for Alfred Harmsworth, he as an editor, and she as a writer of serial fiction. Harmsworth put his editors in their place when she was pregnant, and they were worried about a delayed installment, telling them that Connor would go on just the same even if she were about to give birth to triplets the next day. Many of Connor's stories were, like Convict 99 serialised first in Harmsworth's Answers. 

From 1896 Connor and Leighton were writing almost exclusively for Harmsworth's Daily Mail. Connor continued to produce "potboiling crime stories" sometimes include female heroines. The Times said that her stories were "of the crude, rapidly-moving type, that a pre-cinema public read with approval and delight". Connor published her last novel in 1937, but in practical terms she had given up all serious writing in the 1920s.

Connor died in hospital in Aylsbury, on 28 January 1941. Leighton had died seven years earlier. Mark Bostridge says that Connor "was the archetypal romantic novelist", that she was eccentric and larger than life. Perhaps the best summary comes from the sub-title of her daughter's biography, Connor was an invincible Edwardian.

Notes

References

External links

Books by Connor available online at the British Library.
Books by Connor in the collated catalogues of the Jisc Discover Library Hub.
Tempestuous Petticoat, Clare Leighton's biography of Connor.

British writers
British women writers
1867 births
1941 deaths